Nakhiloo Island (Also: Nakhilo, Nakhilu, Nokhailo)  (Persian: جزیره نخیلو, jazireye Nakhiloo ) is one of the Iranian islands in the Persian Gulf. This small island has an area ca. 6 km2, has a sandy coastline of some 8 km, and is 5 km distant from Ommolkaram. Observations can be made of body pits and tracks signifying considerable hawksbill turtle nesting with several tens of activities in evidence. This is nesting site. The island is located southeast of Bushehr.

References
 

Uninhabited islands of Iran
Landforms of Bushehr Province
Islands of the Persian Gulf